The Somaliland Civil Service Commission is a Somaliland government agency established in 1993 that oversees the employment of civil servants and lead reforms in Somaliland's decentralisation process. Khalid Jama Qodax is the current chairman of the agency. The head of the agency is chairman and is appointed by the President of Somaliland.

Incumbents

See also
 Politics of Somaliland

References

External links
 

Government of Somaliland
Government agencies of Somaliland